Vadis Odjidja-Ofoe (born 21 February 1989) is a Belgian professional footballer who plays as a midfielder for Gent in the Belgian First Division A.

Club career
Odjidja-Ofoe joined the team of his birth area Gent at the age of five. Later on, he was transferred to R.S.C. Anderlecht. He was part of the 2006–07 Anderlecht reserves team that won the reserves championship. In the 2007–08 season, he was promoted to the first team of Anderlecht. On 22 December 2007, he scored his first goal on his full debut for RSCA against RAEC Mons.

In January 2008, he was signed by Hamburger SV. On 9 January 2009, he left Hamburg and moved for €900,000 to Club Brugge K.V. after one year in the Bundesliga.

Odjidja-Ofoe completed his move to English Championship side Norwich City, in August 2014. He made his league debut for Norwich City on 16 September 2014 after coming on as a substitute in an away league match against Brentford. Injury hampered much of Odjidja-Ofoe's first season at Norwich City as they gained promotion to the Premier League. In September 2015, Odjidja-Ofoe moved to Rotherham United on a one-month loan, making four appearances and scoring one goal against Cardiff City.

In August 2016, Odjidja-Ofoe was transferred to Legia Warsaw for an undisclosed fee. Scoring 5 goals and giving 14 assists in 42 official appearances with Legia Warsaw during the 2016–17 season, he was named Ekstraklasa Player of the Season and Midfielder of the Season.

On 9 July 2017, Olympiacos officially announced the purchase of central midfielder Vadis Odjidja-Ofoe from Legia Warsaw, for an estimated amount of €2.5 million. The 28-year-old Belgian international signed a three-years' contract with the team managed by Besnik Hasi. On 16 August 2017, he scored his first goal with the club, as Olympiakos come from behind, in first half, to win 2–1 Rijeka in added time for the 1st leg of UEFA Champions League play-offs. On 22 November 2017 in an away 3–1 loss UEFA Champions League Group stage game against Sporting, Odjidja-Ofoe bagged the only goal of the Reds.

On 21 July 2018, Gent officially announced the acquisition of Ofoe from Olympiacos on a two-year contract. Before the end of the previous season, Olympiacos had put the player out of Pedro Martins' plans for the coming season, forcing him to find a club to continue his career. Odjidja-Ofoe came close to Sporting Lisbon, but the change in the executive staff of the club and the immediate removal of Siniša Mihajlović broke down the Belgian player's transfer to the Portuguese team. Eventually, the 29-year-old returned to his home country on behalf of Gent, with the transfer fee close to €2.2 million.

International career
Odjidja was called up to the Belgium national under 23 team for the 2008 Summer Olympics tournament. He participated in two games; a group stage win over hosts China and a 4–1 semi-final defeat against Nigeria.

In November 2010, he applied for a Ghanaian passport and suggested that he could be considered for representing Ghana at international football in the future. On 17 November, he made his debut for Belgium in an international friendly versus Russia. He came on as a substitute for Eden Hazard in the 90th minute.

He made his second appearance for Belgium in an UEFA Euro 2012 qualifying game against Azerbaijan in March 2011, again coming on as a substitute in the 90th minute, this to replace Steven Defour. He replaced Defour again in a Belgium game versus Kazakhstan in his third international outing replacing him in the 63rd minute. As a result of playing in the UEFA Euro 2012 qualifying games, Odjidja is no longer eligible to play for Ghana.

Career statistics

Honours
Anderlecht
 Belgian Super Cup: 2006

Legia Warsaw
 Ekstraklasa: 2016–17

Gent
 Belgian Cup: 2021–22
Individual
Ekstraklasa Player of the Year: 2016–17
Ekstraklasa Midfielder of the Year: 2016–17

References

External links

 

 
 
 
 

1989 births
Living people
Footballers from Ghent
Belgian footballers
Association football midfielders
Belgium international footballers
Premier League players
Belgian Pro League players
English Football League players
Bundesliga players
Ekstraklasa players
Super League Greece players
R.S.C. Anderlecht players
Hamburger SV players
Hamburger SV II players
Club Brugge KV players
Norwich City F.C. players
Rotherham United F.C. players
Legia Warsaw players
Olympiacos F.C. players
K.A.A. Gent players
Belgian people of Ghanaian descent
Expatriate footballers in Germany
Belgian expatriate footballers
Belgium under-21 international footballers
Belgium youth international footballers
Footballers at the 2008 Summer Olympics
Olympic footballers of Belgium
Expatriate footballers in England
Expatriate footballers in Poland
Expatriate footballers in Greece
Belgian expatriate sportspeople in Germany
Belgian expatriate sportspeople in England
Belgian expatriate sportspeople in Poland
Black Belgian sportspeople